IKON Malaysia is a reality singing competition which searches for a champion among existing or established artistes rather than among new, unknown starlets as in other such singing competitions. The programme was co-launched with IKON Indonesia and IKON Philippines in late 2006 as an initiative to search for an artiste who can represent the country in the regional, ASEAN level. The verdict is determined by 70% of jury marks and 30% SMS.

Ikon Malaysia began its run on Astro Ria in May 2007, and is hosted by Sarimah Ibrahim.

The final stage was held on 28 July 2007. Jaclyn Victor and OAG was chosen to represent Malaysia in Ikon ASEAN which was held on 12 August 2007.

Contenders

Solo
Adam
Daniel Lee
Dayang Nurfaizah
Dina
Ezlynn
Farah
Jaclyn Victor
Mawi
Reshmonu
Shanon Shah

Group/Band
Search
Def Gab C
Disagree
Flop Poppy
Gerhana Skacinta
Jinbara
May
Mirwana
OAG

External links
Official Website
Official Broadcaster

Malaysian reality television series